The German men's national under 20 ice hockey team is the national under-20 ice hockey team in Germany. The team represents Germany at the International Ice Hockey Federation's IIHF World U20 Championship's IIHF World U20 Championship.

History

 1977 IIHF World U20 Championship. Finish: 6th
 1978 World Junior Ice Hockey Championships. Finish: 7th
 1979 World Junior Ice Hockey Championships. Finish: 7th
 1980 World Junior Ice Hockey Championships. Finish: 6th
 1981 World Junior Ice Hockey Championships. Finish: 5th
 /  1982 World Junior Ice Hockey Championships. Finish: 7th
 1983 World Junior Ice Hockey Championships. Finish: 7th
 1984 World Junior Ice Hockey Championships. Finish: 7th
 1985 World Junior Ice Hockey Championships. Finish: 7th
 1986 World Junior Ice Hockey Championships. Finish: 8th
 1987 IIHF World U20 Championship Pool B. Finish: 1st (9th overall)
 1988 World Junior Ice Hockey Championships. Finish: 7th
 1989 World Junior Ice Hockey Championships. Finish: 8th
 1990 IIHF World U20 Championship Pool B. Finish: 2nd (10th overall)
 1991 IIHF World U20 Championship Pool B. Finish: 1st (9th overall)
 1992 World Junior Ice Hockey Championships. Finish: 7th
 1993 World Junior Ice Hockey Championships. Finish: 7th
 1994 World Junior Ice Hockey Championships. Finish: 7th
 1995 World Junior Ice Hockey Championships. Finish: 7th
 1996 World Junior Ice Hockey Championships. Finish: 8th
 1997 World Junior Ice Hockey Championships. Finish: 9th
 1998 World Junior Ice Hockey Championships. Finish: 10th
 1999 IIHF World U20 Championship Pool B. Finish: 4th (14th overall)
 2000 IIHF World U20 Championship Pool B. Finish: 2nd (12th overall)
 2001 IIHF World U20 Championship – Division I. Finish: 2nd (12th overall)
 2002 IIHF World U20 Championship – Division I. Finish: 1st (11th overall)
 2003 World Junior Ice Hockey Championships. Finish: 9th
 2004 IIHF World U20 Championship – Division I. Finish: 1st in Group A (12th overall)
 2005 World Junior Ice Hockey Championships. Finish: 9th
 2006 IIHF World U20 Championship – Division I. Finish: 1st in Group A (11th overall)
 2007 World Junior Ice Hockey Championships. Finish: 9th
 2008 IIHF World U20 Championship – Division I. Finish: 1st in Group A (11th overall)
 2009 World Junior Ice Hockey Championships. Finish: 9th
 2010 IIHF World U20 Championship – Division I. Finish: 1st in Group A (11th overall)
 2011 World Junior Ice Hockey Championships. Finish: 10th
 2012 IIHF World U20 Championship – Division I. Finish: 1st in Group A (11th overall)
 2013 World Junior Ice Hockey Championships. Finish: 9th
 2014 IIHF World U20 Championship. Finish: 9th
 2015 IIHF World U20 Championship. Finish: 10th
 2016 IIHF World U20 Championship – Division I. 5th in Group A (15th overall)
 2017 IIHF World U20 Championship – Division I. 2nd in Group A (12th overall)
 2018 IIHF World U20 Championship – Division I. 3rd in Group A (13th overall)
 2019 IIHF World U20 Championship – Division I. 1st in Group A (11th overall)
 2020 IIHF World U20 Championship. Finish: 9th
 2021 IIHF World U20 Championship. Finish: 6th
 2022 IIHF World U20 Championship. Finish: 6th
 2023 IIHF World U20 Championship. Finish: 8th

References

Ice hockey
Junior national ice hockey teams